Grigoris Papazacharias (Greek: Γρηγόρης Παπαζαχαρίας; born 20 March 1985) is a Greek footballer who plays for Anagennisi Epanomi. He has represented Greece at all youth levels.

Career

Papazacharias began his career in Anagennisi Epanomis. He joined Iraklis in 1999. He stayed in Iraklis for 11 years, until 2010. He over 118 performances with blue-white jersey and he scored 6 league goals. In 2003-2004-2005 years, Iraklis was in very good form, finishing 4th behind Olympiacos, Panathinaikos and AEK Athens, with Papazaharias being in first eleven in center-back duo, with Tasos Katsabis. He appointed as Iraklis captain in 2007. He was in a special love with team's fans and was bringing very good performances. In 2010 summer, he transferred to rivals Aris, with many dreams. But he was very unlucky, because an injury was left him out for about 4 months, and in first season in Kleanthis Vikelidis, he played in only 3 matches (against Atromitos, AEL and Kerkyra In 2011–2012 season, he played first in the match against Xanthi, in Kleanthis Vikelidis, with score 0-0.

On 30 June 2019, Thyella Kamariou FC announced that they had signed Papazaharias.

References

External links

Greek footballers
Greece youth international footballers
1985 births
Living people
Iraklis Thessaloniki F.C. players
Aris Thessaloniki F.C. players
Apollon Smyrnis F.C. players
Enosis Neon Paralimni FC players
Super League Greece players
Cypriot Second Division players
Expatriate footballers in Cyprus
Association football defenders
Greece under-21 international footballers
Footballers from Central Macedonia
People from Thessaloniki (regional unit)